Sherry Cassuto (January 24, 1957 – April 29, 2016) was an American rower. She competed in the women's quadruple sculls event at the 1988 Summer Olympics.

At the 1989 Maccabiah Games in Israel, Cassuto won the single sculls crew event.

She identifies as lesbian.

References

External links
 

1957 births
2016 deaths
American female rowers
Olympic rowers of the United States
Rowers at the 1988 Summer Olympics
Sportspeople from Brooklyn
21st-century American women
Competitors at the 1969 Maccabiah Games
Maccabiah Games gold medalists for the United States
Maccabiah Games medalists

LGBT rowers
American LGBT sportspeople